Nipponithyris is a genus of brachiopods belonging to the family Dallinidae.

The species of this genus are found in New Zealand.

Species:

Nipponithyris afra 
Nipponithyris lauensis 
Nipponithyris nipponensis 
Nipponithyris notoensis 
Nipponithyris subovata 
Nipponithyris yabei

References

Brachiopod genera